Squaloziphius is an extinct genus of odontocete cetacean from the Early Miocene (Aquitanian) aged marine deposits in Washington state.

Systematics
It was originally classified as the most primitive beaked whale, being placed in a separate subfamily, Squaloziphiinae, (followed by Fordyce and Muizon 2001) but later authors have placed it outside Ziphiidae as either Odontoceti incertae sedis or closely related to Ziphiidae. The description of the archaic odontocete Yaquinacetus demonstrated that Squaloziphius was by no means part of Ziphiidae and that these two taxa are more primitive than crown Odontoceti, necessitating elevation of Squaloziphiinae to full familial status, as Squaloziphiidae.

References

Prehistoric toothed whales
Prehistoric cetacean genera
Fossil taxa described in 1991
Extinct mammals of North America
Miocene cetaceans